David Salmon may refer to:

 David Salmon (racing driver), former British racing driver
 David Salmon (tribal chief) (1912–2007), Alaska native and Episcopalian priest
 David A. Salmon, career government functionary